Pie in the Sky is a 1995 American romantic comedy film about a young man obsessed with traffic gridlock who falls in love with an avant-garde dancer. The film was written and directed by Bryan Gordon, and stars Josh Charles, Anne Heche and John Goodman.

Cast
 Josh Charles as Charlie Dunlap
 Anne Heche as Amy
 Peter Riegert as Dad Dunlap
 Christine Ebersole as Mom Dunlap
 Christine Lahti as Ruby
 John Goodman as Alan Davenport
 Dey Young as Mrs. Tarnell
 Wil Wheaton as Jack
 Bob Balaban as Paul 
 Larry Holden as Amy's Boyfriend
 David Rasche as Amy's Dad
 William Newman as a Funeral Guest
 Alfred Dennis as Ruby's Dad

References

External links

1995 films
1995 romantic comedy films
American romantic comedy films
Films scored by Michael Convertino
Films directed by Bryan Gordon
1990s English-language films
1990s American films